Carolyn Adel (born 27 August 1978) is an Olympic and national record holding swimmer from Suriname. She swam for Suriname at the 1996 and 2000 Olympics.

She was the most decorated swimmer at the 1998 Central American and Caribbean Games, where she won 6 events and set 3 Games Records.  She also set 7 Suriname Records, which still stand as of December 2010.

She attended university, and swam for, the USA's Arizona State University.

References

External links

1978 births
Living people
Pan American Games bronze medalists for Suriname
Swimmers at the 1995 Pan American Games
Swimmers at the 1996 Summer Olympics
Swimmers at the 1999 Pan American Games
Swimmers at the 2000 Summer Olympics
Olympic swimmers of Suriname
Surinamese female swimmers
Arizona State Sun Devils women's swimmers
Pan American Games medalists in swimming
Competitors at the 1998 Central American and Caribbean Games
Central American and Caribbean Games gold medalists for Suriname
Central American and Caribbean Games silver medalists for Suriname
Central American and Caribbean Games medalists in swimming
Medalists at the 1999 Pan American Games